William Chamberlain (April 27, 1755September 27, 1828) was an American politician from Vermont. He served as a United States representative and as the fourth lieutenant governor of Vermont.

Biography
Chamberlain was born in Hopkinton in the Province of Massachusetts Bay to Samuel and Martha Mellen Chamberlain. He attended the common schools and worked as a school teacher in Hopkinton until he moved with his father to Loudon in the Province of New Hampshire in 1774. He served as a sergeant during the American Revolutionary War and took part in the Battles of Lexington and Concord and the invasion of Canada. He later engaged in land surveying and farming. He moved to Peacham, Vermont in 1780. Engaging in politics, he was the clerk of the proprietors of the town the same year. He was town clerk from 1785 to 1797.

Chamberlain served as a member of the Vermont House of Representatives in 1785, from 1787 to 1796, in 1805 and in 1808. He also served as a Justice of the Peace from 1786 to 1796 and as a delegate to the state constitutional convention in 1791. He was a member of the Vermont's Governor's Council from 1796 until 1803. He was a brigadier general of the Vermont militia in 1794 and was promoted to major general in 1799.

He was the assistant judge of orange County in 1795 and chief judge of Caledonia County from 1796 until 1803. He served as secretary of the board of trustees of the Caledonia County Grammar School from 1795 until 1812, and as president of the board of trustees from 1813 until 1828.

Chamberlain was elected as a Federalist candidate to the Eighth Congress, serving from March 4, 1803 until March 3, 1805. He was elected to the Eleventh Congress, serving from March 4, 1809 until March 3, 1811.

After serving in Congress, he served as the Lieutenant Governor of Vermont from 1813 until 1815. He was a delegate to the state constitutional convention in 1814.

Personal life
Chamberlain married Jane E. "Jenny" Eastman on March 15, 1781. They had seven children together.

Chamberlain died on September 27, 1828 in Peacham, Caledonia County, Vermont. He is interred at Peacham Village Cemetery in Peacham.

Spelling of name
He signed his name "Chamberlin" and his name appears that way in some official records and other documents.

References

Further reading
 "Chamberlain Family Papers", published by Vermont Historical Society in September 2000.

External links  
 Biographical Directory of the United States Congress: CHAMBERLAIN, William, (1755 - 1828)
 
 govtrack.us: Rep. William Chamberlain
 The Political Graveyard: Chamberlain, William (1755–1828)
 Ancestry.com: PEACHAM.

1755 births
1828 deaths
People from Hopkinton, Massachusetts
People of colonial Massachusetts
American people of English descent
Federalist Party members of the United States House of Representatives from Vermont
People from Caledonia County, Vermont
Lieutenant Governors of Vermont
Members of the Vermont House of Representatives
Vermont state court judges